Among the Missing is a crime novel by American author Richard Laymon. It was first published in 1999 by Headline Publishing. The book is a detective story about an investigation into the murder of a woman whose decapitated body is found on a beach.

Plot summary

The novel takes place in Sierra County, California, primarily around the Silver Lake area. The story begins with a man and woman visiting a section of the Silver River referred to as 'the Bend', apparently with the intention of engaging in a romantic tryst. The next day, the woman's decapitated body is discovered by a young couple, Bass and his girlfriend Faye. Sheriff Rusty Hodges and his daughter-in-law, Deputy Mary "Pac" Hodges, are called in to investigate.

The pursuit of the killer leads to a complicated series of events involving Merton (a homosexual drug dealer who was seen running from the scene of the crime), the dead woman's husband, and a revenge scheme involving two of the main characters.

Adult themes

Like many of Laymon's other works, the book features strong adult content. Themes of sex and rape are present.

1999 American novels
Novels by Richard Laymon
Novels set in California
Sierra County, California
Novels about rape
Headline Publishing Group books